The inner London borough of Wandsworth contains some  of green space in the form of parks, commons, allotments and cemeteries, which is the largest amount for an Inner London borough.  Central London borders some of the borough's boundary with the Thames the closest park to which is Battersea Park.

At , Tooting Commons in the south of the borough, between Balham and Streatham are Wandsworth's largest public open space (not shared with any other borough). It is followed by  Battersea Park. This has Battersea Park Nature Areas, the borough's only local nature reserve.

Wimbledon and Putney Commons are very large open spaces,  in total, partly within the borough, to the south of Putney and Roehampton, and are managed by a board of Conservators rather than any individual borough.

King George's Park is a  stretch of green space along the western side of the River Wandle, just south of Wandsworth town centre. It is one of a string of green spaces along the Wandle Valley, along with  Garratt Park in Earlsfield and Lambeth Cemetery in Tooting.

Remaining green spaces in the borough include Falcon Park in Battersea (a green space enclosed within a railway junction), Wandsworth Park (a Grade II listed park on the River Thames between Wandsworth and Putney), Roehampton Golf Course, Central London Golf Centre, the western half of Clapham Common, Wandsworth Cemetery, Streatham Cemetery and York Gardens, along with a whole host of smaller spaces.

External links
Wandsworth Council parks and open spaces
London Parks discovery project - Wandsworth